Sir Charles Mortimer Tollemache Smith-Ryland KCVO (May 24, 1927 – 1989) was Lord Lieutenant of Warwickshire from 1968 to 1989.

The son of Captain Charles Ivor Phipson Smith-Ryland, he was educated at Eton College and married Jeryl Marcia Sarah Gurdon, daughter of Robert Brampton Gurdon and sister of the third Baron Cranworth, in 1952.

He was a member of Warwickshire County Council from 1949, being Vice-Chairman in 1963 and Chairman from 1964 to 1967.

Appointed a Deputy Lieutenant of Warwickshire in 1954 and High Sheriff of Warwickshire for 1967–68, he became Lord Lieutenant of Warwickshire in 1968.

He was a landowner and farmer, a member of the Royal Agricultural Society, and was, for some time, chairman of the Warwickshire and Coventry Police Authority.

References 
 The Birmingham Post Year Book and Who's Who 1973-74, Birmingham Post and Mail Ltd., July 1973
 Whitaker's Almanack, various editions, Joseph Whitaker & Sons
 ''Rootsweb - http://archiver.rootsweb.ancestry.com/th/read/RYLAND/2001-06/0992304536

1927 births
1989 deaths
Deputy Lieutenants of Warwickshire
Independent politicians in England
Knights Commander of the Royal Victorian Order
Lord-Lieutenants of Warwickshire
People educated at Eton College
Roehampton Trophy